The 2013 season was Sarpsborg 08's 2nd season in Tippeligaen, following their promotion back to the top level in 2012. It was also their first season with Brian Deane as the club's manager. Sarpsborg 08 competed in the Tippeligaen, finishing 14th, entering the Relegation play-offs in which they defeated Ranheim 3-0 over two legs. They also competed in the cup where they reached the Second Round, losing to Kvik Halden of the 2. divisjon.

Squad 
As of 18 September 2013.

Transfers

Winter

In:

Out:

Summer

In:

 

Out:

Competitions

Tippeligaen

Results summary

Results by round

Results

Table

Relegation play-offs

Norwegian Cup

Squad statistics

Appearances and goals

|-
|colspan="14"|Players away from Sarpsborg 08 on loan:

|-
|colspan="14"|Players who left Sarpsborg 08 during the season:

|}

Goal scorers

Disciplinary record

References

Sarpsborg 08 FF seasons
Sarpsborg 08